Valkonen is a Finnish surname. Notable people with the surname include:

 Matti Valkonen (1880–1952), Finnish schoolteacher, farmer and politician
 Sanna Valkonen (born 1977), Finnish football defender
 Joonas Valkonen (born 1993), Finnish ice hockey defenceman

Finnish-language surnames